Sir Peter Kenneth Estlin,  (born July 1961) was the 691st Lord Mayor of the City of London. He is an alderman of the City of London Corporation where he represents the ward of Coleman Street. Having served as a Sheriff of the City of London for 2016–17, he was elected as the Lord Mayor of London on 1 October 2018 and took office at the Silent Ceremony on 9 November 2018. His mayoral theme was Shaping Tomorrow's City Today, promoting the sheer scale of innovation taking place in the UK, alongside championing digital skills, particularly to create a more inclusive society.

Sir Peter is an independent non-executive director of Rothschild & Co and chair of FutureDotNow. He was educated at King Edward's School, Witley and the University of Bristol.  He became chartered accountant and partner with Coopers & Lybrand in 1993. He was chief financial officer for Salomon Brothers Asia, and then for Citi's Investment and Corporate Banking divisions in New York and London.  He joined Barclays bank in 2008 and was appointed Acting Group Chief financial officer in August 2013. Estlin has publicly advocated for the Belt and Road Initiative.

Sir Peter was appointed Knight of the Order of Saint John in 2018, and knighted in the 2020 New Year Honours for services to international business, inclusion and skills.

References 

1961 births
Living people
People educated at King Edward's School, Witley
Alumni of the University of Bristol
Councilmen and Aldermen of the City of London
21st-century lord mayors of London
21st-century British politicians
Sheriffs of the City of London
Barclays people
Citigroup people
Coopers and Lybrand people
British accountants
Chief financial officers
Knights Bachelor